William Hallock, Ph. D., D.Pharm. (1857–1913)  was an American physicist, born at Milton, New York.
He graduated from Columbia College in 1879, and received the degree of Ph.D. from Würzburg, Germany in 1881.

He served as professor of chemistry and toxicology at the National College of Pharmacy in 1889–92, and as physicist of the United States Geological Survey from 1882 to 1891, then returned to Columbia as adjunct professor of physics in 1892.

He became full professor in 1902 and was dean of the faculty of pure science (1906–09).

Professor Hallock wrote Outlines of the Evolution of Weights and Measures and the Metric System (1906).

References

1857 births
1913 deaths
American chemists
American physicists
American science writers
Columbia College (New York) alumni
Columbia University faculty
People from Ulster County, New York
Scientists from New York (state)